Wiz is a cloud security startup headquartered in New York City. The company was founded in January 2020 by Assaf Rappaport, Yinon Costica, Roy Reznik, and Ami Luttwak, all of whom previously founded Adallom. Rappaport serves as CEO, Costica as VP of Product, Reznik as VP of Engineering, and Luttwak as CTO. The company's platform analyzes computing infrastructure hosted in AWS, Azure, GCP, OCI and Kubernetes for combinations of risk factors that could allow malicious actors to gain control of assets and/or exfiltrate valuable data.

As of March 2022, Wiz employed over 200 individuals, with most sales and marketing personnel scattered across North America and Europe while most engineering personnel are based in Tel Aviv, Israel. In August 2022, Wiz claimed to be the fastest ever to scale from $1 million to $100 million in annual recurring revenue (ARR), from February 2021 to approximately July 2022, and stated it was "closing in on 500" employees.

Funding  
Wiz has raised a total of $600 million from a combination of venture capital funds and private investors:

 Series A - In December 2020, Wiz emerged from stealth by raising $100 million from Index Ventures, Sequoia Capital, Insight Partners and Cyberstarts.
 Series B - In April and May 2021, Wiz raised $130 million and $120 million (respectively) on a $1.7 valuation from Index Ventures, Sequoia Capital, Insight Partners, and Cyberstarts.
 Series C - In October 2021, Wiz raised $250 million on a $6 billion valuation from venture capital funds Insight Partners, Greenoaks Capital, Sequoia Capital, Salesforce Ventures, and CyberStarts, and individual investors Bernard Arnault and Howard Schultz.

Research  
Wiz researchers have discovered and responsibly disclosed several cloud vulnerabilities that garnered significant media coverage:

 ChaosDB – A series of flaws in Microsoft Azure's Cosmos DB that made it possible to download, delete, or manipulate databases belonging to thousands of Azure customers.
 OMIGOD – Bugs in Open Management Infrastructure (OMI), a ubiquitous but poorly documented agent embedded in many popular Azure services, that allowed for unauthenticated remote code execution and privilege escalation.
 NotLegit – Insecure default behavior in the Azure App Service that exposed the source code of some customer applications.
 ExtraReplica –  A chain of critical vulnerabilities found in the Azure Database for PostgreSQL Flexible Server that could let malicious users escalate privileges and gain access to other customers' databases after bypassing authentication.
 AttachMe – A cloud isolation vulnerability that, before it was patched by OCI, could have allowed attackers to access and modify other users' OCI storage volumes without authorization.

These findings (and others) have been presented at several conferences, including BlackHat, RSAC, and DEF CON.

References 

Companies of Israel
Security companies
Security companies of Israel